Trisha Low is an American author and poet.

Life and career
Low graduated from the University of Pennsylvania with a BA and New York University with an MA in Performance Studies.

She contributed to the 2011 publication, Against Expression: An Anthology of Conceptual Writing, edited by Craig Dworkin and Kenneth Goldsmith.

Her 2013 book, The Compleat Purge examines how fantasy can impact perceptions including perceptions of female identity.

Her book, Socialist Realism, was published in 2019 and focuses on Low's early childhood and adulthood. It looks at themes such as home and identity and examines her relationships, family and politics. It won the 2019 Believer Book Award in the nonfiction category and the 2020 Lambda Literary Award for Bisexual Nonfiction

She has also written for the San Francisco Museum of Modern Art.

References

Year of birth missing (living people)
Living people
21st-century American poets
American women poets
New York University alumni
University of Pennsylvania alumni
Lambda Literary Award winners